Camille Hoffman is a painter and mixed-media installation artist, living and working in New York, NY. Using everyday materials and drawing from Philippine weaving and Jewish folk traditions, Hoffman combines personal narrative and historical critique. Hoffman's work reflects on the embedded meanings of light, nature, the frontier, borders, race, gender and power in American landscape paintings of the 19th century. Hoffman has worked as an arts educator and community organizer in Phoenix, the San Francisco Bay Area, New Haven, Brooklyn, and Queens.

Early life and education 
Camille Hoffman was born in Chicago, IL in 1987. She earned her BFA in Community Arts and Painting from the California College of the Arts in 2009. She received her MFA in Painting and Printmaking from the Yale School of Art in 2015, during which she received the Carol Schlosberg Memorial Prize for excellence in painting and a Benjamin A. Gilman International Scholarship for research in Spain.

Art 
Camille Hoffman's work examines colonial histories, consumerism, and play. Her paintings and installations layer traditional art materials with textures and objects from the everyday.

Hoffman's landscape works are a mixed-media meditation on Manifest Destiny and its representation in the romantic American landscape. She reflects on the enclosed meanings found in light, nature, the frontier, borders, race, gender and power in the 19th century American landscape paintings. Taking inspiration from her ancestors' Philippine weaving techniques and Jewish folk traditions, with the addition of traditional landscape painting techniques from her academic training, Hoffman integrates refuse into the image, to reveal trans-cultural contradictions. These works incorporate holiday-themed tablecloths, discarded medical records, nature calendars, plastic bags, paint, and other materials to make imaginary landscapes grounded in accumulation, personal narrative and history.

Hoffman has been the recipient of numerous honors, including a National Endowment for the Arts Award and the Van Lier Fellowship from the Museum of Arts and Design.

Exhibits 
Hoffman has exhibited her work throughout the United States and in Europe.

Solo exhibitions 
2005. Subway, Art One Gallery, Scottsdale, AZ

2009. Summer Spectacular, Art One Gallery, Scottsdale, AZ

2009. About Face: Deconstructing Diversity in the Institution, Center Gallery, Oakland, CA

2014. Music & Conversation, Indo-Pacific Gallery, Yale University Art Gallery, New Haven, CT

2015. Service, Marquand Chapel, Yale Divinity School, New Haven, CT

2015. 2,015 But Who's Counting: Yale MFA Thesis Exhibition, Yale School of Art, New Haven, CT

2018. Excelsior: Ever Upward, Ever Afloat, Queens Museum, Queens, NY (through August 26, 2019)

2018. Rockabye My Bedrock Bones, False Flag Projects, Long Island City, NY

2018. Pieceable Kingdom, Fellow Focus, Museum of Arts and Design, New York, NY

Group exhibitions 
2007. A Class Act, Joyce Gordon Gallery, Oakland, CA

2007. Rest in Peace, Rise in Peace, South Gallery, Oakland, CA

2007. Dialects of the Heart, Corazon Del Pueblo Gallery, Oakland, CA

2008. MASIVAMENTE, Espai Cultural Biblioteca Azorín, Valencia, Spain

2008. The Future of Culture, North/South Gallery, Oakland, CA

2011. Road to the Hidden Green Village, 3rdeye(sol)ation Gallery, Brooklyn, NY

2012. Intensive Exhibition, LeRoy Neiman Gallery, Columbia University, New York, NY

2013. Splendor in the Grass, Green Hall Gallery, Yale School of Art, New Haven, CT

2015. Jew as the Other, Abrazo Interno Gallery Clemente Center, New York, NY

2015. Arresting Patterns, Artspace, New Haven, CT

2015. Yale Painting and Printmaking Graduates 2015, Garis & Hahn Gallery, New York, NY

2015. SEEN, Yale institute of Sacred Music, New Haven, CT

2016. New Genealogies, Yale School of Art, New Haven, CT

2017. LifeWtr Open Gallery, Lincoln Center Plaza, New York, NY

2017. Art By a Woman, LifeWtr digital exhibition, Times Square and Oculus at World Trade Center, New York, NY

2018. Volumes: Queens International 2018, Queens Museum, Queens, NY

2018. Art, Artists & You, Children's Museum of Manhattan, New York, NY

2018. Home: Making Space for Radical Love and Struggle, Tecoah Bruce Gallery, California College of the Arts, Oakland, CA

2018. People I Love Who Are Far Away, E.TAY Gallery, New York, NY

2019. Ineffable Manifestations, Yale Institute of Sacred Music

2019. Here We Land, Wave Hill Public Garden and Cultural Center, Bronx, NY (forthcoming)

Awards 
2007 Benjamin A. Gilman International Scholarship, Study in Valencia, Spain
2008 Community Student Fellow, California College of the Arts
2009 National Endowment for the Arts Scholarship
2014 Schickle-Collingwood Prize, Yale University School of Art
2015 Carol Schlosberg Memorial Prize for Excellence in Painting
2015 Yale University John A. Carrafiell Scholarship
2015 Yale University School of Art Editor's Choice
2015 New American Paintings, No. 116, Northeast Issue
2016 Nomination for Joan Mitchell Emerging Artist Grant
2017 Van Lier Fellowship, Museum of Arts and Design, New York, NY

External links
 https://www.camillehoffman.com/about
 https://www.artandobject.com/shorts/pieceable-kingdom-presents-layered-meanings-museum-arts-and-design
 https://www.newyorker.com/goings-on-about-town/art/camille-hoffman-pieceable-kingdom
 https://www.artforum.com/news/queens-museum-announces-artists-participating-in-its-upcoming-biennial-76092
 https://www.nhregister.com/entertainment/article/Co-Op-High-School-s-artist-in-residence-ready-11332101.php#item-85307-tbla-2
 https://observer.com/2018/01/the-5-gallery-shows-to-see-in-new-york-this-january/
 https://www.chicagotribune.com/news/ct-xpm-1989-01-15-8902250371-story.html
 https://madmuseum.org/exhibition/fellow-focus-camille-hoffman
 https://www.matterofhand.com/camille-hoffman/

References 

1987 births
Living people
21st-century American women artists
Artists from Chicago
California College of the Arts alumni
Yale School of Art alumni